Myelois cinctipalpella is a species of snout moth in the genus Myelois. It was described by Hugo Theodor Christoph in 1877. It is found in Turkmenistan.

References

Moths described in 1877
Phycitini